

Cum non solum was a letter written by Pope Innocent IV to the Mongols on March 13, 1245. In it, Pope Innocent appeals to the Mongols to desist from attacking Christians and other nations, and inquires as to the Mongols' future intentions. Innocent also expresses a desire for peace (possibly unaware that in the Mongol vocabulary, "peace" is a synonym for "subjection").

This message was carried by the Franciscan John of Plano Carpini, who successfully reached the Mongol capital of Karakorum, where he attended the election of the new Khan Güyük on August 24, 1246.

Güyük, who had little understanding of faraway Europe or the Pope's significance in it, other than that the Pope was sending a message from an area that the Mongols had not yet conquered, replied to the Pope's letter with a fairly typical Mongol demand for the Pope's submission, and a visit from the rulers of the West in homage to Mongol power:

Naming
Papal letters are generally named by modern scholars, according to their incipit, or beginning. This letter, Cum non solum starts with similar language to the two other letters, Viam agnoscere veritatis and Dei patris immensa. The letter starts, "...regi et populo  Tartarorum viam agnoscere veritatis. Cum non solum homines verum etiam animalia irrationalia nec non ipsa mundialis elementa machine quadam nativi federis..."

See also
 Franco-Mongol alliance

References

Bibliography
 Brand-Pierach, Sandra, Ungläubige im Kirchenrecht, Text of the letter p. 174 
 , English translation of text of the letter

 Roux, Jean-Paul, Histoire de l'Empire Mongol, 1993, Fayard, 
 Setton, Kenneth Meyer,  A History of the Crusades
 MGH Epp. Saec. XIII, Volume 2, pp. 72–75 (original source documents)
 Grousset, René, Histoire des Croisades, III, Tempus, 2006 edition, 
 Rachewiltz, I, Papal Envoys to the Great Khans, Stanford University Press, 1971.
 Runciman, Steven, History of the Crusades, III, Penguin Books, 2002 edition, 

1245
Documents of Pope Innocent IV
Letters (message)
Holy See–Mongolia relations